John Thomas Dunn (June 4, 1838 – February 22, 1907) was a U.S. Representative from New Jersey.

Biography
Born in County Tipperary in Ireland (then a part of the U.K.), Dunn immigrated to the United States with his father, who settled in New Jersey in 1845. He completed elementary studies at home. He engaged in business in 1862.

Dunn was elected a member of the board of aldermen of Elizabeth, New Jersey in 1878. He served as member of the New Jersey General Assembly from 1879 to 1882 and was speaker of the house in 1882. He studied law, was admitted to the bar in 1882 and commenced practice in Elizabeth, New Jersey. Dunn was again elected a member of the city council.

Dunn was elected as a Democrat to the Fifty-third Congress, where he represented the newly created  from March 4, 1893 – March 3, 1895. He was an unsuccessful candidate for reelection in 1894 to the Fifty-fourth Congress.

After leaving office he resumed the practice of law. He died in Elizabeth, New Jersey, February 22, 1907, and was interred in Mount Olivet Cemetery in Newark, New Jersey.

References

External links

John Thomas Dunn at The Political Graveyard

19th-century American politicians
Democratic Party members of the United States House of Representatives from New Jersey
Speakers of the New Jersey General Assembly
Democratic Party members of the New Jersey General Assembly
New Jersey city council members
New Jersey lawyers
Politicians from Elizabeth, New Jersey
1838 births
1907 deaths
Irish emigrants to the United States (before 1923)